Luiza Saidiyeva (born March 17, 1994) is a Kazakh competitive archer. She competed as a member of the Kazakh archery squad in major international tournaments, spanning the World Championships, Asian Championships, the 2014 Asian Games, and the 2016 Summer Olympics.

Career 
Saidiyeva was selected to compete for Kazakhstan in the women's individual recurve at the 2016 Summer Olympics in Rio de Janeiro, Brazil. There, she discharged a score of 625 points, 9 perfect tens, and 3 bull's eyes to seal the thirty-sixth seed in the classification stage, but could not get past Ukraine's Anastasia Pavlova from the opening round, abruptly ending her Olympic debut in a severe 0–6 defeat.

References

External links
 

Kazakhstani female archers
Living people
People from Shymkent
1994 births
Archers at the 2014 Asian Games
Archers at the 2018 Asian Games
Olympic archers of Kazakhstan
Archers at the 2016 Summer Olympics
Asian Games competitors for Kazakhstan
21st-century Kazakhstani women